Mohamed Saad Alami or El Alami ( – born 1948, Chefchaouen) is a Moroccan journalist and politician of the Istiqlal Party. He held the positions of Minister of Relations with the Parliament between 2002 and 2010, then Minister-Delegate for the Modernization of the Public Sector in the cabinets of Driss Jettou and Abbas El Fassi.

See also
Cabinet of Morocco

References

1948 births
People from Chefchaouen
Living people
Moroccan male journalists
Moroccan magazine editors
Mohammed V University alumni
Istiqlal Party politicians
Government ministers of Morocco
Ambassadors of Morocco
Ambassadors of Morocco to Egypt